The Pacific–North American teleconnection pattern (PNA) is a climatological term for a large-scale weather pattern with two modes, denoted positive and negative, and which relates the atmospheric circulation pattern over the North Pacific Ocean with the one over the North American continent.

The positive phase of the PNA pattern features above-average barometric pressure heights in the vicinity of Hawaii and over the inter-mountain region of North America, and below-average heights located south of the Aleutian Islands and over the southeastern United States. The PNA pattern is associated with strong fluctuations in the strength and location of the East Asian jet stream. The positive phase is associated with an enhanced East Asian jet stream and with an eastward shift in the jet exit region toward the western United States. The negative phase is associated with a westward retraction of that jet stream toward eastern Asia, blocking activity over the high latitudes of the North Pacific, and a strong split-flow configuration over the central North Pacific.

The positive phase of the PNA pattern is associated with above-average temperatures over western Canada and the extreme western United States, and below-average temperatures across the south-central and southeastern US. The PNA tends to have little impact on surface temperature variability over North America during summer. The associated precipitation anomalies include above-average totals in the Gulf of Alaska extending into the Pacific Northwestern United States, and below-average totals over the upper Midwestern United States.

The negative PNA phase is associated with the opposite.

Although the PNA pattern is a natural internal mode of climate variability, it is also strongly influenced by the El Niño-Southern Oscillation (ENSO) phenomenon. The positive phase of the PNA pattern tends to be associated with Pacific warm episodes (El Niño), and the negative phase tends to be associated with Pacific cold episodes (La Niña).

See also 
 Teleconnection
 Arctic dipole anomaly
 Arctic oscillation
 El Niño-Southern Oscillation
 European windstorm
 Global storm activity of 2010
 Kuroshio Current
 North Atlantic oscillation
 North Pacific Gyre
 Pacific Decadal Oscillation
 Pineapple Express
 Walker circulation
 Madden–Julian oscillation

References 
 
Barnston, A. G., and R. E. Livezey, 1987: Classification, seasonality and persistence of low-frequency atmospheric circulation patterns. Mon. Wea. Rev., 115, 1083-1126.

Regional climate effects
Physical oceanography